The men's 400 metres at the 1950 European Athletics Championships was held in Brussels, Belgium, at Heysel Stadium on 23, 24, and 25 August 1950.

Medalists

Results

Final
25 August

Semi-finals
24 August

Semi-final 1

Semi-final 2

Heats
23 August

Heat 1

Heat 2

Heat 3

Heat 4

Heat 5

Heat 6

Participation
According to an unofficial count, 16 athletes from 9 countries participated in the event.

 (2)
 (1)
 (2)
 (2)
 (1)
 (2)
 (2)
 (2)
 (2)

References

400 metres
400 metres at the European Athletics Championships